The Volta Conference was the name given to each of the international conferences held in Italy by the Royal Academy of Science in Rome, and funded by the Alessandro Volta Foundation. In the interwar period, they covered a number of topics in science and humanities, alternating between the two.

The first conference, held at Lake Como in 1927, led to the public introduction of the uncertainty principle by Niels Bohr and Werner Heisenberg. The second conference did not take place until 1932; its topic was "Europe", and it was notable for the participation of a number of mainly fascist theorizers, along with non-fascists such as the British historian Christopher Dawson. In 1933 the third conference was on the subject of immunology, and "The Dramatic Theater" in 1934. During this period, the influence of Italian aeronautics was gaining momentum, led by General Gaetano Arturo Crocco, an aeronautical engineer who had become interested in ramjet engines in 1931, and influenced the selection of "High Velocities in Aviation" for the 1935 meeting. This meeting is notable historically as it introduced a number of topics in compressibility and also included the first presentation on swept wings by Adolf Busemann.

References
Research in Supersonic Flight and the Breaking of the Sound Barrier, Chapter 3, John D. Anderson, Jr.

Academic conferences
Italian culture